The 1992 OTB Schenectady Open was a combined men's and women's tennis tournament played on outdoor hard courts that was part of the World Series of the 1992 ATP Tour and Tier V of the 1992 WTA Tour. It was the sixth edition of the tournament and was played in Schenectady, New York in the United States from August 24 through August 31, 1992. Wayne Ferreira and Barbara Rittner won the singles titles.

Finals

Men's singles

 Wayne Ferreira defeated  Jamie Morgan 6–2, 6–7(5–7), 6–2
 It was Ferreira's 3rd title of the year and the 5th of his career.

Women's singles

 Barbara Rittner defeated  Brenda Schultz 7–6(7–3), 6–3
 It was Rittner's first singles title of her career.

Men's doubles

 Jacco Eltingh /  Paul Haarhuis defeated  Sergio Casal /  Emilio Sánchez 6–3, 6–4
 It was Eltingh's 2nd title of the year and the 6th of his career. It was Haarhuis' 2nd title of the year and the 6th of his career.

Women's doubles

 Alexia Dechaume /  Florencia Labat defeated  Ginger Helgeson /  Shannan McCarthy 6–3, 1–6, 6–2

References

 
Schenectady Open
OTB Open
OTB Schenectady Open